Khudala Temple is a Hindu temple located in the village of Khudala in Rajasthan, India.

Sorashah, the son of Ramdev of the Porval lineage and Naldhar built this temple. The inscription of the statue states that it was built in 1243 of the Vikram era. The statue is plastered. On the sixth day of the dark half of the month of Vaishakha, a flag is hoisted every year.

See also
Khudala

References

Religious buildings and structures completed in 1243
Pali district
Hindu temples in Rajasthan
13th-century Hindu temples